This is a list of mayors and lord mayors of Newcastle and its predecessors, a local government area of New South Wales, Australia. The official title of Lord Mayors while holding office is: The Right Worshipful Lord Mayor of Newcastle. First incorporated on 7 June 1859 as the "Municipality of Newcastle", the council became known as "The Borough of Newcastle" on 23 December 1867 following the enactment of The Municipalities Act of 1867, and on 1 April 1938 the "City of Greater Newcastle" was proclaimed. In recognition of Newcastle's role as NSW's second oldest and largest city, the council applied to have the title "Lord Mayor", which was granted in October 1947 by King George VI and applied in October 1948. This made Newcastle the first Australian city that was not a capital to receive such an honour. On 1 April 1949 the official title of the council became the "City of Newcastle".

The current Lord Mayor of Newcastle is Nuatali Nelmes (Labor), who was elected in a by-election on 15 November 2014. The previous Lord Mayor, Councillor Jeff McCloy (Independent), elected in 2012, resigned on 17 August 2014.

List of incumbents

Notes and references

External links
 The City of Newcastle (Council website)

Newcastle
Mayors
 
Mayors of Newcastle